Dischisma is a genus of flowering plants belonging to the family Scrophulariaceae.

Its native range is Namibia to South African Republic.

Species:

Dischisma arenarium 
Dischisma capitatum 
Dischisma ciliatum 
Dischisma clandestinum 
Dischisma crassum 
Dischisma fruticosum 
Dischisma leptostachyum 
Dischisma spicatum 
Dischisma squarrosum 
Dischisma struthioloides 
Dischisma tomentosum

References

Scrophulariaceae
Scrophulariaceae genera
Taxa named by Jacques Denys Choisy